The 2006 Winter Olympics torch relay took part as part of the build-up to the 2006 Winter Olympics hosted in Turin, Italy. Stefania Belmondo lit the cauldron at the opening ceremony.

Torch

The torch was a modern interpretation of the traditional wooden torch, in which it is the metal that seems to catch fire and burn. The flame envelops the body of the torch rather than exiting from a hole on the top, like earlier torches. A dynamic, innovative shape was created to develop this concept, which recalls the tip of a ski but also the building that is a symbol of Turin, the Mole Antonelliana.

Route in Greece
November 27
Olympia
November 28
Aroania, Kalavryta
November 29
Parnassos Ski Centre
November 30
Karpenisi, Pertouli
December 1
Kalabaka, Metsovo
December 2
Vasilitsa, Kozani
December 3
Pisoderi
December 4
Naousa, Kato Vermio
December 5
Elatochori, Thessaloniki
December 7
Volos, Stylida
December 8
Mount Parnassus, Arachova, Livadeia, Thebes, Athens

Route in Italy

References

External links
The complete route of the 2006 Olympic Torch Relay

Torch Relay, 2006 Winter Olympics
Olympic torch relays